"Live Together" is a song recorded by British singer, songwriter and actress Lisa Stansfield for her debut album, Affection (1989). It was written by Stansfield, Ian Devaney and Andy Morris, and produced by Devaney and Morris. It was released as the third European single on 29 January 1990, and included previously unreleased song "Sing It" and remixes of "Live Together" created by Massive Attack and Steve Anderson. It became a hit in Europe, reaching top ten in the Netherlands, Belgium, the UK and Italy, and top forty in other European countries.

In 2003, it was included on Biography: The Greatest Hits. In 2014, the remixes of "Live Together" and "Sing It" were included on the deluxe 2CD + DVD re-release of Affection and on People Hold On ... The Remix Anthology (also on The Collection 1989–2003).

Chart performance
"Live Together" was quite successful on the charts in Europe, entering the top 10 in Belgium (7), Italy (10), the Netherlands (5) and the UK (10). In the latter, the song peaked at that position in its second week on the UK Singles Chart on 11 February 1990, after having debuted at number 19 the week before. It reached the top 20 in Finland (16), Ireland (11), Spain (17) and Switzerland (15), as well as on the Eurochart Hot 100, peaking at number 19 in March same year. Additionally, it was a top 30 hit in Austria (30) and West Germany (23). Outside Europe, "Live Together" peaked at number 23 and 62 in New Zealand and Australia, respectively.

Critical reception
Upon the album release, The Atlanta Journal-Constitution wrote that Stansfield's voice "alternately soars, sobs and adds over-dubbed backup vocals" on self-penned tunes such as "Live Together". J.D. Considine from The Baltimore Sun praised her "warm, emotive voice", "seeming soulfully insinuating" through the song. A reviewer from Billboard described it as "Gloria Gaynor-ish" and said the singer "shows just what powerful potential she has". Bob Stanley from Melody Maker viewed it as "a lacklustre follow-up by the girl with the Subbutea painted haircut." He added, "How does it compare to Lisa's other singles? More of the same only less so." 

Pan-European magazine Music & Media stated that the re-recorded version of the track from Stansfield's debut LP is a good follow-up to "All Around the World". The reviewer noted further that the Philadelphia soul-type orchestration "helps to make this song an undoubted hit." David Giles from Music Week commented, "Another homage to the sound of Seventies soul which has got the orchestral parts exactly right. As a song, it's the equal of "All Around the World", even if the lyrics are a bit drippy." Paul Simper from Number One felt that there's a bit in the midst of "Live Together" "which oddly reminds one" of Eurythmics' "You Have Placed a Chill in My Heart".

Retrospective response
In an 2020 retrospective review, Matthew Hocter from Albumism described "Live Together" as "‘70s inspired soul".

Music video
The accompanying music video for "Live Together" was directed by Philip Richardson. He had previously directed the video for "All Around the World".

In the video, Stansfield stands at a train station. She sings in front of the train tracks. The video has a blue tone. Stansfield is wearing a big cap and a long coat. Her kiss curls are visible. Some scenes also see her singing on the bridge over the railroad tracks. Several trains come and go throughout the video. In the end, she runs towards a young man standing on the station and throws himself over him. They embrace each other. As the video ends, they walk away while holding each other around.

"Live Together" was later published on Stansfield's official YouTube channel in September 2010, and had generated almost 800,000 views as of January 2023.

Track listings

 European 7" single (New Version)
"Live Together" (New Version) – 4:37
"Sing It" (Edit) – 3:56

 European CD single (New Version)
"Live Together" (New Version) – 4:37
"Sing It" (Edit) – 3:56
"Live Together" (Extended Version Edit) – 7:02
"Live Together" (Big Beat Mix Edit) – 3:50

 European 12" single (New Version)
"Live Together" (Extended Version) – 8:55
"Live Together" (Big Beat Mix) – 5:00
"Sing It" – 5:32

 European CD and 12" single (Remix)
"Live Together" (Home Sweet Home Mix) – 7:42
"Live Together" (Live It Up) – 6:42
"Live Together" (Mood Mix) – 5:36

Charts

Weekly charts

Year-end charts

References

Lisa Stansfield songs
1990 singles
Songs written by Lisa Stansfield
1989 songs
Arista Records singles
Songs written by Ian Devaney
Songs written by Andy Morris (musician)
New jack swing songs